Sigil is a fictional city and the center of the Planescape campaign setting for the Dungeons & Dragons fantasy role-playing game.

Publication history

Development 
Sigil was originally created for Planescape as the setting's "home base". According to Steve Winter in 30 Years of Adventure: A Celebration of Dungeons & Dragons, "A movable base, like a vessel of some sort (or an artifact, which was the original idea for the means of traversing the planes) wouldn't do it. It had to be a place that characters could come home to when they needed to, and it had to be central to the nature of the setting." Sigil's fifteen factions were created because, "Vampire: The Masquerade was a particularly hot game at [the] time and one of the ideas in it that we really liked was the clans. Jim Ward wanted to be sure that players had something to identify with and to give them a sense of belonging in this alien venue [Sigil]."

Advanced Dungeons & Dragons 2nd edition (1989–1999) 

Sigil is first described in the Planescape Campaign Setting boxed set, released in 1994. It is also featured prominently in some later Planescape rulebooks, including In the Cage: A Guide to Sigil (1995), The Factol's Manifesto (1995), and Uncaged: Faces of Sigil (1996), as well as in many adventures, such as The Eternal Boundary (1994), Harbinger House (1995), and Faction War (1998).

Dungeons & Dragons 3.5 edition (2003–2008) 
A short description of Sigil is in this edition's Dungeon Master's Guide (2003).  Information on Sigil can also be found in various 3.0 and 3.5 sourcebooks, such as the Manual of the Planes and the Planar Handbook. A small reference to Sigil also appears in the Epic Level Handbook aside other planar metropolis such as Tu'narath.

Dungeons & Dragons 4th edition (2008–2014) 
Sigil is described in the 4th edition Manual of the Planes and expanded upon in Dungeon Master's Guide 2. The City of Doors, unlike many planes, remains almost completely unchanged from earlier editions.

Shannon Appelcline, author of Designers & Dragons, commented that while Sigil "had been largely ignored during the 3e era", it "was faring better in 4e, despite the large-scale restructuring of D&D's cosmology" due to small inclusions in the Dungeon Master's Guide (2008) and Manual of the Planes. Appelcline highlighted that it was the 4th Edition Dungeon Master's Guide 2 which "saw the return of the fan-favorite setting of Sigil" which "was laid out as a full paragon-level setting. There's not much new here for old-time fans of Planescape, but there was one big change as a result of Faction War (1998). The factions that caused much of the conflict in Planescape are now gone. [...] The Dungeon Master's Guide 2 also contains 'A Conspiracy of Doors', the first Sigil adventure to see print in many years".

Dungeons & Dragons 5th edition (2014–) 
Sigil is briefly mentioned in Appendix C of the 5th edition's Player's Handbook. There is also some information on Sigil in Dungeon Master's Guide at the end of Chapter 2.

Reception
Scott Haring, in his review of the Planescape Campaign Setting for Pyramid, described Sigil as "a strange city with doors to every plane and every reality, and inhabitants from all those planes and realities living together in (more or less) harmony." Trenton Webb of British RPG magazine Arcane calls the city "splendidly bizarre" and declares that "Sigil, The Lady of Pain's citadel, is an elegant gaming construct, yet it can often feel a little hollow", feeling that life in Sigil should be "a swirl of plots, factions and sedition that leaves players' heads spinning, wounds bleeding and experience points tally in overdrive".

Sigil as depicted in Planescape: Torment was praised by Evan Narcisse from Kotaku as one of the richest science fiction and fantasy worlds in video games.

Ari David, for CBR, commented that "Sigil is the ultimate inter-dimensional trading post, offering goods and transport not only to other planes but allows passage between the multitude of Material Planes that comprise D&D’s campaign settings". Daniel Colohan, also for CBR, included Sigil in the "15 D&D Outer Planes That Would Make Great Campaign Settings" list — Colohan highlights that "the most notable location in the Outlands is Sigil, the City of Doors. [...] The city of Sigil would be the ideal starting location for a campaign centered around the Outer Planes, as portals between each of the planes are commonplace. It could also provide a resting point between adventures, allowing the party to catch their breath between forays into D&Ds dangerous outer planes".

In the game

Sigil is located above the tall Spire at the center of the Outlands. It has the shape of a torus; the city itself is located on the inner surface of the ring.  There is no sky, simply an all-pervasive light that waxes and wanes to create day and night.  Sigil cannot be entered or exited save via portals; although this makes it quite safe from any would-be invader, it also makes it a prison of sorts for those not possessing a portal key.  Thus, sometimes Sigil is called "The Cage".  Though Sigil is pseudo-geographically located "at the center of the planes" (where it is positioned atop the infinitely tall Spire), scholars argue that this is impossible since the planes are infinite in all dimensions, and therefore there can never truly be a center to any or all of them; thus, Sigil is of no special importance. Curiously, from the Outlands one can see Sigil atop the supposedly infinite Spire.

Sigil contains innumerable portals that can lead to anywhere in the Dungeons & Dragons cosmology: any bounded opening (a doorway, an arch, a barrel hoop, a picture frame) could possibly be a portal to another plane, or to another point in Sigil itself.  Thus, the city is a paradox: it touches all planes at once, yet ultimately belongs to none; from these characteristics it draws its other name: "The City of Doors'''".

Sigil is ruled by the Lady of Pain. Sigil is also highly morphic, allowing its leader to alter the city at her whim.

Theoretically, Sigil is a completely neutral ground: no wars are waged there and no armies pass through.  Furthermore, no powers (such as deities) are allowed to enter the city (though some have broken this rule).

In other media
Sigil is also the setting for the 1999 video game Planescape: Torment, in which the player is the immortal "Nameless One." The team chose to place the game around a central fixture of Planescape, the city of Sigil, and the game begins with the character waking up on a cold stone slab in the Mortuary of Sigil, with no idea of who he is, what he is doing there or how he died. In an interview with RPGWatch, Chris Avellone commented on the use of Sigil as the game's main setting, saying "We felt Sigil was the part of Planescape we really had to get right from the outset in case we made more games. It's the signature city, but... we did sacrifice other planar locations so that we could do it."

See also
 Multiverse
 Cynosure, a pan-dimensional city from the GrimJack comics
 M'Kraan Crystal, a Nexus of Realities in the Marvel Universe

References

 Slavicsek, Bill. Doors to the Unknown.
 Cordell, Bruce, and Miller, Steve. Die Vecna Die! (TSR, Inc., 2000).
 Denning, Troy. Pages of Pain (TSR, Inc., 1997).
 Cordell, Bruce and Kestrel, Gwendolyn. Planar Handbook (WoTC, 2004).
 Torment'' (October 1999), by Ray Vallese and Valerie Vallese,.

Dungeons & Dragons populated places
Fictional city-states
Planescape